t Zwaantje is a smock mill in Nijemirdum, Friesland, Netherlands which was built in 1878. The mill has been restored to working order. It is listed as a Rijksmonument.

History
The mill was probably built in 1878, replacing an earlier mill that had been built c.1790 and had burnt down. Draining the Huitebuurster polder, it was formerly named De Huitebuurstermolen, only being renamed t Zwaantje in 1987. In 1956, the mill was partly dismantled and a Lister diesel engine was installed to pump water. The mill was restored in 1986 by Messrs Waghenbrugghe of Sneek, Friesland. The restoration incorporated the sails, windshaft, brake wheel and Archimedes' screw from De Noordster, Nieuwe Bildtdijk, which had been demolished in 1984. It was thought that De Noordster only dated from 1936, and thus it was not listed as a Rijksmonument.  This was an error, as the mill actually dated from 1818; 1936 being the date that the leading edges of the sails were fitted with Dekkerised leading edges. 't Zwaantje was capable of draining or pumping water into the polder. The mill was restored in 1987.

't Zwaantje was sold to Stichting De Fryske Mole on 1 January 1996, the 47th mill acquired by that organisation. A further restoration took place in 2007. The mill is listed as a Rijksmonument, No. 358041.

Description

t Zwaantje is what the Dutch describe as a Grondzeiler. It is a two-storey smock mill on a single-storey brick base. There is no stage, the sails reaching almost to ground level. The mill is winded by tailpole and winch. The smock and cap are thatched. The sails are Common sails. The sails are carried on a cast iron windshaft, which was cast by IJzergieterij H. J. Koning of Foxham, Groningen in 1910. It also carries the brake wheel which has 48 cogs. This drives the wallower (31 cogs) at  the top of the upright shaft. At the bottom of the upright shaft there are two crown wheels The upper crown wheel, which has 34 cogs, drives an Archimedes' screw. The lower crown wheel, which has 33 cogs is carried on the axle of an Archimedes' screw, which is used to drain the polder. The screw is  diameter. It is inclined at 30°. Each revolution of the screw lifts  of water.

Public access
t Zwaantje is open to the public by appointment or whenever it is working.

References

Windmills in Friesland
Windmills completed in 1878
Smock mills in the Netherlands
Windpumps in the Netherlands
Agricultural buildings in the Netherlands
Rijksmonuments in Friesland
Octagonal buildings in the Netherlands